Stephen Bekassy (born István Békássy; February 10, 1907 – October 30, 1995) was a Hungarian-born American film actor.

Career
Bekassy's American stage debut came in Errand for Berenice in Pittsburgh, Pennsylvania, in 1944. His American film debut was in A Song to Remember (1945).

He appeared in films such as Hell and High Water and Prisoner of War in 1954. On television he made two guest appearances on Perry Mason. In 1958 he played art expert Laslo Kovac in "The Case of the Purple Woman," and in 1959 he played murder victim Rick Stassi in "The Case of the Bartered Bikini." In 1958, he guest-starred as Count Razil in the episode "Command Performance" of the CBS situation comedy Mr. Adams and Eve.

Personal life
Bekassy was born in Nyíregyháza, Hungary. He married Teri Fejes in 1931, but divorced in 1933. In 1936 he married Lívia Neufeld, but as well divorced soon in 1938. He emigrated to the United States and eventually married Beverly Violet Bidwell (1905 - 1971) on October 8, 1941, in Carson City, Nevada. Beverly Violet Bidwell wrote under the name, Hagar Wilde. They later divorced. In 1969 he married Erika Beregi. He subsequently married Hanna Hertelendy (1919–2008), the widow of actor Robert Walker.

During World War II, Bekassy rescued Jewish escapees. He later worked with Radio Free Europe/Radio Liberty.

During the Red Scare, Ronald Reagan accused Stephen of being a Communist because he was Hungarian.

Filmography

References

External links 

 
 
 

Hungarian male film actors
American male film actors
Hungarian emigrants to the United States
1907 births
1995 deaths
20th-century American male actors